This is a list of awards and nominations received by Seventeen, a South Korean boy band formed in 2015 by Pledis Entertainment.


Awards and nominations

Other accolades

State and cultural honors

Notes

References

Awards
Seventeen